Hieracium bifidum is a species of flowering plant belonging to the family Asteraceae.

Its native range is Europe.

Subspecies:
 Hieracium bifidum subsp. submaculosum (Dahlst.) Zahn (synonym: Hieracium prolixum Norrl.)

References

bifidum